Felicia amoena is a variably hairy, sometimes glandular, biennial or perennial plant, of about  high, that is assigned to the family Asteraceae. It is somewhat woody at its base, roots at the nodes if these contact the soil, and has ascending branches. The leaves are oppositely arranged along the stems at and just above a branching fork, further up the leaves alternate. Three subspecies have been recognised, that differ in width of the leaves and the involucral bracts, the size of the heads and number of ray florets and in having glandular hairs. These can be found in coastal sands and inland areas in the Western Cape and Eastern Cape provinces of South Africa. Flower heads can be found from June till October.

Description 
The branches are often crowded near the plants foot, while the nodes that rest on the ground easily develop roots, the more distant parts of the side branches ascend. The arrangement of the leaves on the stem changes from opposite to alternating. At the foot the leaves are in several opposite leaf pairs, and further upwards the leaves alternate, but after each branching, the lower one or two pairs are again opposite.

In the center of each corolla are five anthers merged into a tube, through which the style grows when the floret opens, hoovering up the pollen on its shaft. At the tip of both style branches is a triangular appendage.

Felicia amoena subsp. latifolia is a diploid having eight sets of homologue chromosomes (2n=16).

Differences between the subspecies 
Felicia amoena and its three subspecies are among the most variable taxa in the genus. It has up to twenty five ray florets of about 12 mm long and 2 mm wide surrounding yellow disc florets. Subsp. latifolia has broader leaves, that are lance-shaped to inverted egg-shaped, 4–1 cm long and 4–10 mm wide. The disc florets often turn dark red with age.

Taxonomy and naming 
As far as known, the first specimen of this daisy species was collected in 1826, where the road from the Potberg crosses the Breede River, by Cape Town organ player Ludwig Beil. It is now assigned to the subspecies latifolia. A plant collected by Johann Franz Drège at Riebeek-Kasteel, was described by Augustin Pyramus de Candolle in 1836, who called it Agathaea stricta, is now assigned to subsp. stricta. The first specimen now assigned to subspecies amoena was collected from Hout Bay on the west coast of the Cape Peninsula by Christian Ferdinand Friedrich Krauss in 1838. It was described in 1843 by Carl Heinrich 'Bipontinus' Schultz, who named it Agathaea amoena. In 1865, William Henry Harvey, who was a lumper, sunk Agataea in Aster, creating the combination Aster amoenus. He distinguished a slightly different specimen, that had been collected by Karl Wilhelm Ludwig Pappe, and named it after him Aster pappei. Harvey further distinguished Aster elongatus var. spathulaefolius in the same publication. Finally Harvey regarded De Candolle's specimen as a variety that should be placed under Christian Friedrich Lessing's species Aster adfinis (now Felicia dubia), creating the combination Aster adfinis var. stricta. In 1948, the eminent South African botanist Margaret Levyns created the combination Felicia amoena, that is still in use today. In his 1973 Revision of the genus Felicia (Asteraceae), Jürke Grau distinguished three subspecies: F. amoena subsp. amoena, F. amoena subsp. stricta, and his new taxon F. amoena subsp. latifolia.  The species is considered to be part of the section Neodetris.

The species epithet amoena means "beautiful" or "pleasing" and is said to refer to the attractive flower heads.

Distribution, habitat and ecology 
Felicia amoena subsp. amoena has the smaller distribution of the three subspecies. It is restricted to the sandy soils around the Cape Peninsula and near Gordons Bay. Subsp. latifolia has the largest area and occurs along the coast from the Cape Peninsula in the very west to the mouth of the Sundays River in the east. An isolated population also occurs in the southern Cedarberg. Subsp. stricta can be found inland, from the Cedarberg in the north, via the Piketberg along the western edge, around Ceres, near Worcester and Swellendam on the eastern edge to Bredasdorp in the south.

Conservation 
The continued survival of all three subspecies of Felicia amoena is considered to be of least concern because their populations are stable.

References

External links 
 Photos of Felicia amoena amoena on iNaturalist
 Photos of Felicia amoena latifolia on iNaturalist
 Photos of Felicia amoena stricta on iNaturalist
 Line drawing of Felicia amoena amoena
 Line drawing of Felicia amoena latifolia
 Line drawing of Felicia amoena stricta
 Distribution maps of the three subspecies of Felicia amoena

amoena
Endemic flora of South Africa
Plants described in 1763